Xibozi railway station was a station of Jingbao Railway in Beijing. It is closed as of 2010.

See also

List of stations on Jingbao railway

Railway stations in Beijing